Peter E. Hart (born 1941) is an American computer scientist and entrepreneur. He was chairman and president of Ricoh Innovations, which he founded in 1997. He made significant contributions in the field of computer science in a series of widely cited publications from the years 1967–75 while associated with the Artificial Intelligence Center of SRI International, a laboratory where he also served as director.

Education
Hart studied at Rensselaer Polytechnic Institute, leading to a BEE degree (1962). He did his graduate studies at Stanford University, where he got his MS (1963) and PhD (1966); Thomas M. Cover was his advisor and discovered & co-published a seminal paper on 1-NN nearest neighbor search.

Career
While at the SRI International Artificial Intelligence Center, Hart co-authored 20 papers, among them the initial exposition of the A* search algorithm and the variant of the Hough transform now widely used in computer vision for finding straight line segments in images. He also contributed to the development of Shakey the Robot.

Hart and Richard O. Duda are the authors of "Pattern Classification and Scene Analysis", originally published in 1973. This classic text is a widely cited reference, and the first edition was in print for over 25 years until being superseded by the second edition in 2000.

A strong advocate of artificial intelligence in industry, Hart was the founding director of the Fairchild/Schlumberger Artificial Intelligence Center and co-founder of Syntelligence, a company specializing in expert systems for financial risk analysis.

Hart is currently Group Senior Vice President at the Ricoh Company, Ltd.

Memberships and awards
Hart is an IEEE Fellow, an ACM Fellow and an AAAI Fellow.

References

External links
 Hart's personal web page
 Hart's web page at Ricoh Innovations

American engineering writers
Rensselaer Polytechnic Institute alumni
Stanford University alumni
1940s births
Living people
SRI International people
Fellow Members of the IEEE
Fellows of the Association for Computing Machinery
Fellows of the Association for the Advancement of Artificial Intelligence